Orest Zinoviyovych Lebedenko (born 23 September 1998) is a Ukrainian professional footballer who plays as a left back for Spanish club Deportivo de La Coruña.

Club career
Lebedenko is a product of the FC Pokrova Lviv and FC Karpaty Lviv's Sportive School Systems. He made his debut for Karpaty playing as a start squad player in a match against FC Dynamo Kyiv on 29 July 2017 in the Ukrainian Premier League.

On 21 January 2019, Segunda División side CD Lugo reached an agreement with Karpaty for the transfer of Lebedenko, who signed a four-and-a-half-year contract with the club. His release clause amounts to 3.2 million euros and his contract is valid until 2023. On January 31, 2020 he was loaned to FC Olimpic Donetsk. 

On 21 January 2023, Lebedenko signed for Primera Federación Group 1 club Deportivo de La Coruña on a two-and-a-half year contract.

References

External links
 
 
 

1998 births
Living people
Sportspeople from Lviv
Ukrainian footballers
Association football defenders
Ukrainian Premier League players
FC Karpaty Lviv players
Segunda División players
CD Lugo players
FC Olimpik Donetsk players
Deportivo de La Coruña players
Ukraine under-21 international footballers
Ukrainian expatriate footballers
Ukrainian expatriate sportspeople in Spain
Expatriate footballers in Spain